Super Good Films, also credited as Mega Super Good Films in Telugu cinema, is an Indian film production and distribution company in Tamil cinema. It was established in the 1980s by R. B. Choudary.

History 
R. B. Choudary hails from a Rajasthani family. He was into steel, exports and jewels business before entering film production. He started his career as a producer with Malayalam film industry first and produced a few films under "Super" banner. In 1989, he entered Tamil film industry and produced films on 'Super' banner in partnership with R. Mohan, who manufactured "Good Knight" mosquito mats. When they decided to part ways, Choudary borrowed good from 'Good Knight' and modified it as 'Super Good' films.

Super Good Films was created by R. B. Choudary in the late 1980s and the producer continued to manage the film's activities for twenty years. Several successful directors in the Tamil film industry were given their first film by the studio, including K. S. Ravikumar (Puriyaadha Pudhir), Vikraman (Pudhu Vasantham), Sasi (Sollamale), Ezhil (Thulladha Manamum Thullum) and N. Lingusamy (Aanandham).

In the studio's 50th venture, Choudary's youngest son Jiiva was cast in the debut lead role for the film Aasai Aasaiyai (2003) by Ravi Mariya. The Mohanlal-Vijay starrer, Jilla (2014) marked the studio's 85th film.

In the 2010s, Choudary's son, actor Jithan Ramesh, took over co-managerial duties. The studio has often associated with actor Vijay, and Jiiva suggested that they planned to make their hundredth venture with the actor during an interview in January 2018.

Filmography 
Production

Distribution

References 

Film production companies based in Chennai
1988 establishments in Tamil Nadu
Indian companies established in 1988
Mass media companies established in 1988